Dai Wei is the founder and chief executive officer (CEO) of the Chinese bike-sharing company ofo.

Early life and education 
In 2009, he studied in the department of finance of Guanghua School of Management in Peking University. After graduating in 2013, he followed the central branch of the mission in Dongxia town, Dantong county, Qinghai province, and worked as a maths teacher for one year. In 2014, he returned to Peking University for his master's degree.

Life 
He is a young entrepreneur and obtained his MSc of Economics from Peking University. In 2014, Dai Wei cofounded bike-sharing startup Ofo, the first dockless sharing bike platform in the world. Adhere to the concept of "not to produce cars, only to connect cars", this sharing economy corporation committed to meeting the needs of urban residents for short-distance travel while promoting the development of shared economy and environmental protection

After raising hundreds of millions of dollars from a list of powerful investors including Coatue Management, Chinese ride-sharing service Didi Chuxing, and Russian billionaire investor Yuri Milner, Dai Wei expanded Ofo rapidly across China and worldwide. For the US market, Dai Wei personally hired Uber spokesperson and Mandarin speaker Chris Taylor to run ofo US operations. Taylor has been instrumental in ofo's global success and also helps Dai on Chinese projects as well.

In 2017, Dai Wei made the Forbes List of 30 under 30 Asia for Consumer Technology.

Lina Feng had joined Dai Wei's senior leadership team in 2018 to manage US and China operations.

After rumors of bankruptcy and a potential buyout by Didi and Ant Financial, in 22 October 2018, the legal representative of Ofo changed. Chen Zhengjiang replaced Dai Wei becoming the legal representative of Dongxia Datong (Beijing) Management Consultancy Co. Ltd., the operating company of Ofo.

References

Businesspeople from Anhui
Living people
1991 births
People from Xuancheng
High School Affiliated to Renmin University of China alumni
Chinese chief executives
21st-century Chinese businesspeople